The Veria railway station is the railway station of Veria in Central Macedonia, Greece.

History
Opened in June 1894 as Karaferye railway station in what was then the Ottoman Empire at the completion of the Société du Chemin de Fer ottoman Salonique-Monastir, a branchline of the Chemins de fer Orientaux from Thessaloniki to Bitola. During this period Northern Greece and the southern Balkans where still under Ottoman rule, and Veria was known as Karaferye. Veria was annexed by Greece on 18 October 1912 during the First Balkan War. On 17 October 1925 The Greek government purchased the Greek sections of the former Salonica Monastir railway and the railway became part of the Hellenic State Railways, with the remaining section north of Florina seeded to Yugoslavia. In 1926 the station, along with the settlement, was renamed Veria. In 1970 OSE became the legal successor to the SEK, taking over responsibilities for most of Greece's rail infrastructure. On 1 January 1971, the station and most of Greek rail infrastructure where transferred to the Hellenic Railways Organisation S.A., a state-owned corporation. Freight traffic declined sharply when the state-imposed monopoly of OSE for the transport of agricultural products and fertilisers ended in the early 1990s. Many small stations of the network with little passenger traffic were closed down. Since 2007, the station is served by the Proastiakos Thessaloniki services to New Railway Station. In 2009, with the Greek debt crisis unfolding OSE's Management was forced to reduce services across the network. Timetables were cut back and routes closed as the government-run entity attempted to reduce overheads. In 2017 OSE's passenger transport sector was privatised as TrainOSE, currently a wholly owned subsidiary of Ferrovie dello Stato Italiane infrastructure, including stations, remained under the control of OSE. In July 2022, the station began being served by Hellenic Train, the rebranded TranOSE

Facilities
The station is still housed in the original brick-built station building with a booking office and waiting rooms. There is no footbridge over the lines, though passengers can walk across the rails; it is not wheelchair accessible.

Services
As of 2020, the station is served on a daily basis by three InterCity trains between Thessaloniki and Florina and 18 Prostiakos terminating at Edessa. There are no Services to Bitola as the short international connection is now disused, with all international traffic being routed via Idomeni and Gevgelija.

Station Layout

External links
https://www.gtp.gr/TDirectoryDetails.asp?id=77283

References

Railway stations in Central Macedonia
Railway stations opened in 1894
Buildings and structures in Imathia